The following article is a summary of the 2017–18 football season in Armenia, which is the 26th season of competitive football in the country and runs from August 2017 to May 2018.

League tables

Armenian Premier League

Armenian First League

Armenian Cup

Final

National team

2018 FIFA World Cup qualifiers

References

 
Seasons in Armenian football